Oxurina is a subtribe of darkling beetles in the family Tenebrionidae. There are about 8 genera and more than 50 described species in Oxurina, found in southern and central Africa.

Genera
These eight genera belong to the subtribe Oxurina:
 Decoriplus Louw, 1979
 Miripronotum Louw, 1979
 Namibomodes Koch, 1952
 Oxura Kirby, 1819
 Palpomodes Koch, 1952
 Pterostichula Koch, 1952
 Stenethmus Gebien, 1937
 Synhimba Koch, 1952

References

Tenebrionidae